The Early versus Late Intervention Trial with Estradiol (ELITE) was a large randomized controlled trial that assessed the timing hypothesis that menopausal hormone therapy in early but not late menopause would improve cardiovascular outcomes.

References

Clinical trials related to cardiology